Eastern Cape Parks are the national parks, marine protected areas, nature reserves and other nature conservation areas in the Eastern Cape province of South Africa. Eastern Cape Parks and Tourism Agency (ECPTA) is the governmental organisation responsible for maintaining wilderness areas and public nature reserves in the Eastern Cape, based in East London.

National Parks situated in the Eastern Cape 

 Camdeboo National Park
 Addo Elephant National Park
 Mountain Zebra National Park
 Garden Route National Park, consisting of: 
 Knysna National Lake Area (Western Cape)
 Tsitsikamma National Park (Eastern Cape)
 Wilderness National Park (Western Cape)

Mega Parks in the making, predominantly in the Eastern Cape 
 Greater Addo Elephant National Park
 Addo Elephant National Park
 Woody Cape Nature Reserve
 Addo Elephant National Park Marine Protected Area
 Bird Island
 St. Croix Island, Algoa Bay
 Baviaanskloof Mega Reserve
 Baviaanskloof Reserve, (Western Cape)
 Baviaanskloof Provincial Nature Reserve
 Baviaanskloof Wilderness Area, privately owned.
 Baviaanskloof Conservation Area
 Guerna Wilderness Nature Reserve
 Kouga Wilderness Area
 Kouga private Nature Reserve
 Berg Plaatz Provincial Reserve
 Sepree River Private Nature Reserve
 Beakosneck Private Natur Reserve
 Berg Plaatz Provincial Nature Reserve

Parks managed by Eastern Cape Parks and Tourism Agency
 Commando Drift Nature Reserve
 Dwesa Nature Reserve also known as the Dwesa-Cwebe Provincial Nature Reserve
 Dwesa-Cwebe Marine Protected Area
 East London Coast Nature Reserve
 Fort Fordyce Nature Reserve
 Great Fish River Nature Reserve
 Andries Vosloo Kudu Reserve
 Double Drift Nature Reserve    
 Sam Knott Nature Reserve
 Great Kei Nature Reserve
 Kei Mouth Reserve
 Great Kei River Private Nature Reserve
 Hluleka Nature Reserve also known as Hluleka Provincial Nature Reserve
 Hluleka Marine Protected Area
 Mkhambathi Nature Reserve also known as Mkambati
 Pondoland Marine Protected Area
 Mpofu Nature Reserve also known as Mpofu Provincial Game Reserve
 Oviston Nature Reserve
 Silaka Nature Reserve also known as Silaka Provincial Wilderness Reserve
 Thomas Baines Nature Reserve
 Tsolwana Nature Reserve
 Water's Meeting Provincial Nature Reserve

Natural Heritage Sites 
 Barville Park Natural Heritage Site
 Elmhurst Natural Heritage Site
 Glendour Natural Heritage Site
 Kasouga Farm Natural Heritage Site
 Kruizemuntfontein Natural Heritage Site

Private and Other Parks 
 Aberdeen Nature Reserve
 Alexandria Coast Reserve
 Amakhala Game Reserve
 Amalinda Nature Reserve
 Asanta Sana Game Reserve
 Aylesbury Nature Reserve
 Beggar's Bush Nature Reserve
 Bayeti Game Reserve
 Beakosneck Private Nature Reserve
 Buffelspruit Nature Reserve
 Makana Coleridge Game Reserve
 Citruslandgoed Game Farm
 Christmas Rock to Gxulu River Marine Protected Area
 Dorn Boom Game Farm
 East Cape Game Farm
 Emlanjeni Private Game Reserve
 Groendal Wilderness Nature Reserve (Mierhoopplaat)
 Guerna Wilderness Nature Reserve see Baviaanskloof Mega Reserve
 Hoeksfontein Game Farm
 Hillside Safaris Game Farm
 Hopewell Game Reserve
 Hunters Lodge Game Farm
 Hunts Hoek Safaris Game Farm
 Inkwenkwezi Private Game Reserve
 Inthaba Lodge Game Farm
 Jarandi Safaris Game Farm
 Karoo Safaris Game Farm
 Kingsdale Game Farm
 Koedoeskop Game Farm
 Kuzuko Game Reserve
 Kwandwe Private Game Reserve
 Lady Slipper Nature Reserve
 Lanka Safaris Game Farm
 Loerie Dam Nature Reserve
 Lottering Coast Reserve
 Luchaba Wildlife Reserve
 Mbumbazi Nature Reserve
 Mierhoopplaat Nature Reserve
 Minnawill Game Farm
 Monteaux Game Farm
 Mpofu Provincial Game Reserve
 Nyara River Mouth Marine Area
 Oudekraal Game Farm
 Rockdale Game Farm
 Rupert Game Farm
 Samara Private Game Reserve
 Scotia Safaris Game Farm
 Schuilpatdop Game Farm
 Sepree River Private Nature Reserve
 Shamwari Game Reserve
 Stinkhoutberg Nature Reserve
 Timbili Game Reserve
 Tregathlyn Game Farm
 Trumpeter's Drift Game Farm

Forest Reserves 
 Andrews State Forest
 Blue Lily's Bush Forest Reserve
 Hankey State Forest
 Hogsback State Forest
 Inyarha (Nyara) Forest Reserve
 Isidenge State Forest
 Katberg State Forest
 Kologha Forest Reserve
 Koomans Bush State Reserve
 Kruisrivier Forest Reserve
 Kubusi Indigenous State Forest
 Longmore State Forest
 Lottering Forest Reserve
 Plaatbos Forest Nature Reserve
 Robbe Hoek Forest Reserve
 Storms River Forest, part of the Tsitsikamma National Park
 Welbedacht State Forest
 Witelsbos State Forest

See also 
 South African National Parks
 Protected areas of South Africa

References

External links 
 Eastern Cape Parks
 World Database on Protected Areas